The 1996 Bedford Borough Council election took place on 2 May 1996 to elect members of Bedford Borough Council in England. This was on the same day as  other local elections.

Summary

Election result

Ward results

Brickhill

Bronham

Carlton

Castle

Cauldwell

Clapham

De Parys

Eastcotts

Goldington

Harpur

Kempston East

Kempston West

Kingsbrook

Newnham

Putnoe

Queens Park

Roxton

Wootton

References

Bedford
Bedford Borough Council elections
1990s in Bedfordshire